Mount Street is an east–west, quite narrow, archetypal street in the Mayfair district of the City of Westminster, London fronted by many mid-rise buildings, mostly of a narrow frontage.  The sides of two very grand hotels flank part of either end of the street. Small, high-end property businesses, investment funds and accountancy businesses punctuate the buildings as well as a row of traditional businesses and conversion-style mansion block apartments or, more generally, authentic such homes.

Location

Mount Street runs from Park Lane in the west to Davies Street in the east. It is crossed by Park Street in the east and South Audley Street midway. On the south side Rex and Balfour Places branch off. In the east it leads to Berkeley Square and Carlos Place, Mount Street Mews and Carpenter Street branch off.

A notable area has been set aside to the south of the middle section, a canopy-covered public lawn with benches, Mount Street Gardens.

History
Mount Street was one of the original shopping streets when Mayfair was built up.

Buildings

Mount Street is mostly made up of four and five storey older buildings, often with retail premises on the ground floor, and some mansion blocks.

The residence of the Brazilian ambassador is No. 54.

The Grosvenor House and Connaught hotels top and tail the street, having side entrances onto the street.

James Purdey & Sons is on a corner with South Audley Street.

The Terrace of shops and flats at 125-9 is by the architect William Henry Powell and dates from 1886 to 1887. It is Grade II listed.

Scott's is a seafood restaurant at 20 Mount Street.

The members club George is situated at 87-88 Mount Street.

Notable residents
H. H. Asquith, politician. 
Fanny Burney, at No. 102
David Carritt (1927-1982), art historian, dealer and critic, at No. 120
Lady Mary Coke, at No. 34
David Meller (born 1959), businessman, at No. 79
Winston Churchill (1874-1965), statesman, at No. 105
Rev. Dr. John Lockman, Canon of Windsor

In popular culture
W. E. Johns's creation 'Biggles' had a flat on Mount Street.
 In the "Raffles" stories written by E. W. Hornung, the character Bunny Manders has a flat in Mount Street.
In Georgette Heyer’s 1949 publication 'Arabella' the wealthy Mr. Beaumaris lived on Mount Street. This book is set in the Regency era, 1817.

References

Sources
 ; online

External links